Samuel Abbott or Sam Abbott may refer to:

 Samuel Warren Abbott (1837–1904), American physician
 Samuel E. Abbott, American football coach
 Samuel Abbott (watchman), sole casualty of 1911 Capitol fire in New York
 Sam Abbott (Canadian football), Canadian football player
 Sam Abbott, former mayor of Takoma Park, Maryland